The Battle of Yeongpyeong (or Second Battle of Yeonpyeong) (Korean: 제2 연평해전, Je I(2) Yeonpyeong Haejeon) was a confrontation at sea between North Korean and South Korean patrol boats along a disputed maritime boundary near Yeonpyeong Island in the Yellow Sea in 2002. This followed a similar confrontation in 1999. Two North Korean patrol boats crossed the contested border and engaged two South Korean Chamsuri-class patrol boats. The North Koreans withdrew before South Korean reinforcements arrived.

Background

The Northern Limit Line  is considered by South Korea to be the maritime boundary between itself and North Korea, while North Korea disagrees and states that the boundary is farther south. North Korean fishing vessels often wander into the area and are frequently chased away by South Korean patrol vessels. Occasionally a North Korean patrol tries to enforce its southern claim by traversing the limit line. In 2002 one such incursion turned into a naval battle along the limit line.

Engagement
On 29 June 2002, amid the festive atmosphere of the 2002 FIFA World Cup being held in South Korea, a North Korean patrol boat crossed the northern limit line and was warned to turn back. Shortly afterward, a second North Korean patrol craft crossed the line and it was also warned to retreat across the line. The North Korean boats began threatening and harassing the South Korean vessels following them.

At 10:25, the vessel that first crossed the line opened fire with its 85 mm gun and scored a direct hit on the wheelhouse of PKM-357 causing several casualties.

The two squadrons then began a general engagement. The South Koreans using their 40 and 20 mm guns against the North Korean RPGs, 85 mm, and 35 mm guns. About ten minutes later, two more PKMs and two corvettes reinforced the South Korean vessels and severely damaged one of the North Korean craft. Now heavily outnumbered and taking casualties, the North Korean vessels retreated back across the Limit Line at 10:59.

Aftermath

Both the North Korean and South Korean flotillas took casualties from the action. Thirteen North Koreans were killed and twenty five wounded. The South Koreans suffered six fatalities, four during the battle, one 83 days later from wounds suffered during the battle, and one found dead at sea after the battle. The dead were Lt. Cmdr. Yoon Yeong-ha, Jo Cheon-hyung, Seo Hu-won, and Hwang Do-hyeon (during the battle), Park Dong-hyeok (days later), and Han Sang-guk (found at sea); Eighteen others were injured.

The damaged PKM-357 later sank while under tow, while the damaged North Korean vessel was able to limp its way back to port. Both sides laid blame on each other and South Korea demanded an apology from North Korea.

According to a North Korean defector's statement in 2012, the North Korean patrol boat crewmembers involved in the battle suffered extensive splinter injuries from the South Korean "Devastator" shells. The injured North Koreans were reportedly quarantined in a hospital in Pyongyang to hide the extent of the casualties suffered in the battle.

PKM 357 was later raised and towed to Pyeongtaek Naval Base, where she now a museum ship.

In popular culture
Northern Limit Line, a 2015 South Korean war film based on the battle

See also

 1999 Yeonpyeong incident
 Daecheong incident
 ROKS Cheonan sinking
 Shelling of Yeonpyeong

Notes

References
 
 Van Dyke, Jon M., Mark J. Valencia and Jenny Miller Garmendia. "The North/South Korea Boundary Dispute in the Yellow (West) Sea," . Marine Policy 27 (2003), 143-158.

Yellow Sea
Yeongpyeong
Yeongpyeong
Yeongpyeong
Anti-North Korean sentiment in South Korea
Anti-South Korean sentiment in North Korea
2002 in North Korea
2002 in South Korea
June 2002 events in Asia
June 2002 events in South Korea